A group of disgruntled police, firefighters, and accomplices in and around Boston, Massachusetts carried out an arson spree from February to November 1982. Upset about budget cuts to their departments following the passage of Proposition 2 1/2, the group believed the increase in fire-related crime would rectify their situation. However, they were so brazen that Massachusetts briefly became the arson capital of the entire United States, attracting the attention of BATF investigators, who unravelled the plot. U.S. Attorney William F. Weld began handing down indictments in July 1984. According to Attorney General William French Smith, there were at least 163 fires, which injured more than 270 firefighters and permanently disabled several of them. The eight-member arson ring caused more than $22 million in property damage alone. Criminal sentences ranged from five to sixty years in prison, with the final defendant being sentenced to six years in March 1985.

References

External links

Arson in Massachusetts
1982 in Massachusetts
1982 fires in the United States
1980s in Boston
Fires in Boston